The Men's foil event took place on November 7, 2010 at Grand Palais.

Foil individual

References

External links
Bracket

2010 World Fencing Championships